The Musée des Blindés ("Museum of Armoured Vehicles") or Musée Général Estienne is a tank museum located in the Loire Valley of France, in the town of Saumur. It is now one of the world's largest tank museums. It began in 1977 under the leadership of Colonel Michel Aubry, who convinced both the French military hierarchy and the local political authorities. Started  years ago with only a few hundred tracked vehicles, it has become a world-class collection which attracts  visitors interested in the history of multinational tank development as well as professional armor specialists. From the very beginning, Colonel Aubry had made it a key policy of the museum to restore to running condition as many historically or technically significant vehicles as was feasible.

The museum has the world's largest collection of armoured fighting vehicles and contains well over 880 vehicles, although the British Tank Museum has a larger number of tanks. Because of shortage of space, less than a quarter can be exhibited, despite the move to a much larger building in 1993. Over 200 of the vehicles are fully functional, including the only surviving German Tiger II tank still in full working order. It often performs in the spectacular armor demonstration for the public, called the Carrousel, which takes place in the summer every year. Saumur was the traditional training center for cavalry for over a century but now holds the current Armoured Cavalry Branch Training School which is entirely dedicated to training armor specialists. The tank museum had its early origins in a study collection. It is still a State institution funded by the Army, but it is managed by the Association des Amis du Musée des Blindés which publishes a substantial yearly magazine and encourages membership from the public. There is also a separate traditional horse cavalry museum in the town of Saumur.

Exhibited vehicles 

Armoured vehicles are presented in 11 themed rooms. This section gives the highlights.
First World War
Four French vehicles are presented, some still in running condition: Schneider CA1, Saint-Chamond, Renault FT and a Renault truck.
French Campaign 1940
All the main armoured vehicles in service in the French army are presented: Hotchkiss H39, Renault Char B1 bis, Somua S35, AMR 33 and Renault R35 amongst others.
Allied World War II
US (M3 Lee, M4 Sherman, GMC DUKW "Duck"), British (Matilda, Crusader, Churchill tank Mk V) as well as Soviet vehicles (T-34, SU-100) are exhibited.
Germany World War II
28 well preserved German armored fighting vehicles are shown, including several Marder I, Marder III, Panzer II, Panzer III, Panzer IV, Tiger I, Tiger II (functioning), Jagdpanther and Panther.
Curiosity Room
This rooms includes some very odd vehicles, such as a Vespa 150 TAP carrying a 75 mm recoilless rifle, and some vehicles rebuilt for historical movies.
Warsaw Pact
A BMP-1, T-54, T-62, BTR-70, BRDM-2 and T-72 are the highlights of this section. Some of these are Iraqi tanks that were captured intact during the first Gulf War.
NATO
British (Centurion, Chieftain, Conqueror), US (M26 Pershing, M47 Patton, M48 Patton, M60 Patton) and German tanks (Leopard 1, Leopard 2) are featured.
Post World War II France
There are some rare items in this section, including the AMX ELC bis, ARL 44, AMX 50, AMX 40, an AMX 30 with a nuclear tipped Pluton missile, as well as more common models such as the AMX 13, AMX 10 P, AMX 10 RC, AMX 30 and the Leclerc.

All experimental French military vehicles where development has been abandoned are kept here. The vast storage rooms are only accessible to special guests. There is an enormous library, archiving the records of the history of French armour. The museum was renamed after General Jean Baptiste Eugène Estienne, the creator of the French tank arm.

See also
Tank museums
Cavalry Tank Museum - India
German Tank Museum - Germany
Kubinka Tank Museum - Russia
Military museum Lešany - Czech Republic
Polish Army Museum – large collection of Soviet, western and Polish AFVs
Parola Tank Museum - Finland
The Tank Museum - United Kingdom
Yad La-Shiryon - Israel
American Heritage Museum - United States
Base Borden Military Museum - Canada

External links

 Official website of the museum
 picture gallery
  map of the museum, with list of exhibited vehicles
website of Russian friends of the museum (in Russian)

Museums in Maine-et-Loire
World War I museums in France
World War II museums in France
Tank museums